The 1913–14 Kentucky State Wildcats men's basketball team competed on behalf of the University of Kentucky during the 1913–14 season. The team finished with a 12–2 record. Tom Zerfoss and Karl Zerfoss were on the team.

References

Kentucky
Kentucky Wildcats men's basketball seasons